Beishaowa station is a station on the Changping Line of the Beijing Subway. It was opened on 26 December 2015.

Station Layout 
The station has an underground island platform.

Exits 
There are 4 exits, lettered A, B, C, and D. Exits B and C are accessible.

References

Railway stations in China opened in 2015
Beijing Subway stations in Changping District